is a song recorded by Japanese duo Yoasobi, featuring special group Midories, from their second EP, The Book 2 (2021). It was released on October 25, 2021, through Sony Music Entertainment Japan, as a stand-alone digital single. It features as a theme song of NHK's SDGs children television program series Hirogare! Irotoridori.

Written by Ayase and based on Nana Ototsuki's novel Chiisana Tsubame no Ōkina Yume, "Tsubame" expresses aspects and behavior of humans towards nature and sympathy for others via the perspective of a swallow. Commercially, the song debuted at number 19 on the Billboard Japan Hot 100 and number 29 on the Oricon Combined Singles Chart. The accompanying music video premiered on December 2. The English version "The Swallow" was released on November 4, 2022.

Background

On April 20, 2021, Yoasobi announced being in charge of writing and singing a new theme song for NHK's Hirogare! Irotoridori, a new television show series introducing and making children learning United Nations's Sustainable Development Goals (SDGs) accessibly. The song would be written and based on the winner's original novel from the project Yoasobi to Tsukuru Mirai no Uta, under the heading "living together". The winning story was announced on July 9, titled , written by 15-year-old Nana Ototsuki, from a total of more than 700 novels.

The song's title, "Tsubame", was announced on September 28. Ayase said about the song, "I wanted to make a song that brightens the message of what we can do about the perspective of swallows flying in the sky, the activities and problems of the people we can see from there, just by listening to it." The SDGs Kodomo group, called Midories, was also announced on the same day, consists of 5 elementary school students from the first to the fifth grades: Atsuki, Ukyou, Lexie, Ririna, and Yumeri to feature vocals of the song with Yoasobi. In addition, the song also features as Minna no Uta on-air song in October and November 2021.

Release

On October 1, 2021, Yoasobi announced to include "Tsubame" on their second EP, titled The Book 2, as the first track, alongside "Moshi mo Inochi ga Egaketara", a theme song of the stage of the same name, schedule for release on December 1, 2021. A week later, on October 8, the song was announced to release as a stand-alone single, scheduled on October 25 to digital music and streaming platforms. The full song was aired for the first time at the duo's radio show Yoasobi's All Night Nippon X on October 19 and played at several places in Japan before release, including Lawson, FamilyMart, Ministop, Matsuya, Sukiya, Shibuya Center Gai, and Takeshita Street. The cover artwork of "Tsubame" depicts a painting of a swallow flying toward the city in the distance, designed by Niina Ai, who also teamed up with "Yoru ni Kakeru", and "Gunjō". The English version of "Tsubame", titled "The Swallow", was released on November 4, 2022. and included on the duo's second English-language EP E-Side 2, released on November 18.

Lyrics and composition

"Tsubame" was written by Ayase, a member, and producer of Yoasobi, and recorded by the vocals of the duo Ikura, featuring the vocals of Midories. It was composed in the key of E♭ major, 105 beats per minute with a running time of three minutes and 37 seconds. Lyrically, like the based story Chiisana Tsubame no Ōkina Yume, "Tsubame" tells from the perspective of a swallow as a protagonist, shows the tragedy of the sea it went through, positive and negative aspects and behavior of humans towards nature, sympathy for others, and ends up with a scene where swallows bring happiness to people. The song incorporates the idea that even small swallows can achieve big things if they cooperate together, which leads to the efforts of SDGs.

Commercial performance

In Japan, "Tsubame" entered Billboard Japan Hot 100 at number 19, and also debuted at number three on the Download Songs with 13,355 download units, and number 77 on the Streaming Songs. The song landed on the Oricon Combined Singles Chart at number 29, and the Digital Singles Chart at number three, selling 15,660 units.

Music video

An accompanying music video of "Tsubame" was premiered on December 2, 2021, illustrated and directed by Niina Ai. The NHK E's children program Zawazawa'en no Ganpē-chan released their version of the music video on October 21. The full version of the dance music video was uploaded on October 25, the same day as the single release on Hirogare! Irotoridori official website and NHK's official YouTube channel.

The English version "The Swallow"'s music video was uploaded on November 4, 2022, alongside the release. The "World version" music video premiered via NHK E's Aokiiro on November 7, featuring characters from Sesame Street and children from 23 countries supported by Japan International Cooperation Agency (JICA).

Live performances

Midories and Hirogare! Irotoridoris mascots, Ao and Kii performed the two minutes and twenty seconds version of "Tsubame" for the first time on October 1 at Minna no Uta. Mikiko handled its choreography, shows flying hopefully to the future like a swallow, called "tsubame dance". Yoasobi gave a debut performance of "Tsubame" together with Midories for the first time at NHK's music show Songs on December 2, 2021, alongside "Loveletter", and "Taishō Roman". The duo performed the song at 72nd NHK Kōhaku Uta Gassen as part of Colorful Special Project on December 31.

Other versions

A cover of "Tsubame" by Japanese ska and jazz band Tokyo Ska Paradise Orchestra, featuring Midories, Neru Nagahama, and Tokyo Metropolitan Katakura High School brass band club, was released digitally on May 11, 2022, alongside the performance video, for the special edition Minna no Uta, Minna no Uta: Hirogare! Irotoridori, aired in May.

On July 4, 2022, the sole Midories version of "Tsubame" was released through digital music platforms, including on their studio album Tsubame to SDGs no Uta, collaborated with Ryūnosuke Kamiki, and Fumi Nikaido, who voiced the Hirogare! Irotoridoris mascot Ao, and Kii, respectively. It was released on July 27.

Track listing
 Digital download / streaming
  – 3:37

 Digital download / streaming
 "The Swallow" (English version) – 3:37

Credits and personnel

Credits adapted from The Book 2 liner notes and YouTube.

 Ayase – songwriter, producer
 Ikura – vocals
 Midories – chorus
 AssH – guitar
 Nana Ototsuki – based story writer
 Takayuki Saitō – vocal recording
 Masahiko Fukui – mixing
 Niina Ai – cover artwork design, music video animation

Charts

Weekly charts

Year-end charts

Certifications

Release history

References

External links
 

2021 singles
2021 songs
Japanese-language songs
Songs about birds
Sony Music Entertainment Japan singles
Yoasobi songs